Peter Neil Temple Wells CBE DSc FMedSci FREng FIET FInstP FLSW FRS (19 May 1936 in Bristol, England – 22 April 2017) was a British medical physicist who played a major role in the application of ultrasound technology in medicine.

Education
Wells was educated at Birmingham College of Advanced Technology and the University of Bristol where he was awarded his PhD in 1966.

Career and research
Wells has made a number of notable contributions to the application of engineering and physics in medicine. He is the originator and developer of instruments for ultrasonic surgery and ultrasonic power measurement, as well as the two-dimensional, articulated-arm ultrasonic general purpose scanner and the water-immersion ultrasonic breast scanner.

He demonstrated ultrasonic-pulsed Doppler range gating, and was the discoverer of the ultrasonic Doppler signal characteristic of malignant tumour neovascularisation. He investigated ultrasonic bioeffects and formulated ultrasonic safety guidelines and conditions for prudent use of ultrasonic diagnosis.

Wells has led multidisciplinary studies of ultrasonic diagnosis and made major contributions to the advancement of light transmission, electrical impedance and nuclear magnetic resonance imaging, as well as to interventional telepresence. He also proposed a novel philosophy of medical imaging. In the early part of the 21st century, he was developing ultrasonic Doppler and phase-insensitive tomography.

Honours and awards
1983 Fellow of the Royal Academy of Engineering
2003 Fellow of the Royal Society
2006 Duddell Medal and Prize
2009 Appointed Commander of the Order of the British Empire (CBE) in the 2009 New Year Honours. 
Founding Fellow of the Learned Society of Wales
2013 Royal Medal from the Royal Society
2014 Sir Frank Whittle Medal

References

External links 
 

1936 births
2017 deaths
Medical doctors from Bristol
Commanders of the Order of the British Empire
Fellows of the Royal Society
Fellows of the Royal Academy of Engineering
Fellows of the Learned Society of Wales
Fellows of the Academy of Medical Sciences (United Kingdom)
Royal Medal winners
Medical physicists